The 1989–90 Nationalliga A season was the 52nd season of the Nationalliga A, the top level of ice hockey in Switzerland. 10 teams participated in the league, and HC Lugano won the championship.

Regular season

Playoffs

Relegation

External links
 Championnat de Suisse 1989/90

Swiss
1